"Smoke Gets in Your Eyes" is a show tune written by American composer Jerome Kern and lyricist Otto Harbach for the 1933 musical Roberta. The song was sung in the Broadway show by Tamara Drasin. Its first recorded performance was by Gertrude Niesen, who recorded the song with orchestral direction from Ray Sinatra, Frank Sinatra's second cousin, on October 13, 1933. Niesen's recording of the song was released by Victor, with the B-side, "Jealousy", featuring Isham Jones and his Orchestra.

Paul Whiteman had the first hit recording of the song on the record charts in 1934.

The song was reprised by Irene Dunne, who performed it in the 1935 film adaptation of the musical co-starring Fred Astaire, Ginger Rogers, and Randolph Scott. The song was also included in the 1952 remake of Roberta, Lovely to Look At, in which it was performed by Kathryn Grayson, and was a number 1 chart hit in 1959 for The Platters.

Later recordings

1930s–1950s

Paul Whiteman and his Orchestra performed the song with vocals by Bob Lawrence. This version of the song topped music charts in 1934. The Tommy Dorsey orchestra released their version in 1938. The B-side to Dorsey's single was "Night and Day". During the mid-to-late 1930s, Larry Adler and Henry Hall recorded live radio performances of the song on BBC Radio. Adler's rendition was a syncopated, harmonica arrangement. Hall's was with the BBC orchestra with vocals by Dan Donovan. Hall's version was released as a 10" single. Pianist Art Tatum said in an introduction in 1955 that he performed "Smoke Gets in Your Eyes" in the 1930s.

Andre Kostelanetz recorded an easy listening arrangement of the song for Columbia Masterworks (4265-M) in 1941.
  
In 1941, the Benny Goodman Orchestra played the song on the radio with Helen Forrest. Forrest left the ensemble during the early part of 1941. Goodman replaced her with Peggy Lee. Her recording for a Mutual broadcast was released on the album Benny and Sid Roll 'Em. Glenn Miller conducted his rendition of the song at Abbey Road Studios in 1944, but due to his death later that year, his version was unreleased until 1995.

On October 30, 1946, Nat "King" Cole recorded the song in his trio with Oscar Moore on guitar and Johnny Miller on double bass, during a live broadcast from New York City. Cole performed it on television in 1957 for The Nat King Cole Show.

Harry Belafonte made a recording of the song in 1949 with jazz saxophonist Zoot Sims. This was one of Belafonte's first recordings. Sims' performance was parodied on December 10, 1977, on The Muppet Show by Zoot from Dr. Teeth and The Electric Mayhem, the character he inspired.

In 1950, Charlie Parker and Jo Stafford each released versions of the song on their respective albums, Bird at St. Nick's and Autumn in New York. Eartha Kitt recorded the song for her 1954 album That Bad Eartha. Dinah Washington released the song in 1956 on her album Dinah!. Jeri Southern named her 1957 album When Your Heart's On Fire after a lyric from the song; the album features her version of the song. The same year as Nat King Cole's televised performance of the song, Polly Bergen performed the song during the series premiere of her variety show The Polly Bergen Show, originally airing September 21, 1957. In 1958, Sarah Vaughan released her rendition on her album, No Count Sarah. Eartha Kitt recorded "Smoke Gets in Your Eyes" with the Henri Rene Orchestra in 1952. These sessions also yielded her hit single "Santa Baby".

The Platters version

"Smoke Gets in Your Eyes" was recorded in 1958 by The Platters for their album Remember When? The group's version became a number one hit in the U.S. on the Billboard Hot 100 music chart. In 1959 it peaked at No. 3 on the Rhythm and Blues chart. The song spent 20 weeks on the UK charts, peaking at Number 1 for one week on March 20 of that same year. Buck Ram, the producer, said that Harbach praised them "for reviving his song with taste."  The widow of composer Jerome Kern disliked the recording so much she considered legal action to prevent its distribution.

Chart history

Weekly charts

Year-end charts

All-time charts

Blue Haze version

Johnny Arthey's studio group Blue Haze released a version of "Smoke Gets in Your Eyes" as a single in 1972, and on the album Blue Haze the following year. Their version was an international hit, reaching the top 10 in Belgium, the Netherlands, and on Billboards Easy Listening chart.

Chart performance

See also 

List of 1930s jazz standards
List of number-one singles in Australia during the 1950s
List of number-one singles from the 1950s (UK)
List of Hot 100 number-one singles of 1959 (U.S.)
List of number-one hits of 1959 (Italy)

References

External links
 

1933 songs
1930s jazz standards
1958 singles
1959 singles
1972 singles
Barbra Streisand songs
Benny Goodman songs
The Platters songs
Songs with music by Jerome Kern
Songs with lyrics by Otto Harbach
Billboard Hot 100 number-one singles
Cashbox number-one singles
Number-one singles in South Africa
UK Singles Chart number-one singles
Number-one singles in Australia
Number-one singles in Canada
Number-one singles in Italy
Penny McLean songs
Songs from musicals
Torch songs
Eartha Kitt songs
Nana Mouskouri songs
Mercury Records singles
Victor Talking Machine Company singles
A&M Records singles
Carly Simon songs
Irene Dunne songs